Yrigoyen may refer to:

People:
Manuel Yrigoyen Diez Canseco, Peruvian politician in the early 20th century
Álvaro Enrique Arzú Yrigoyen (born 1946), the 32nd President of Guatemala, from 1996 to 2000
Hipólito Yrigoyen (1852–1933), twice President of Argentina (from 1916 to 1922 and again from 1928 to 1930)

Places:
Hipólito Yrigoyen, Santa Cruz, village and municipality in Santa Cruz Province in southern Argentina
Hipólito Yrigoyen, Misiones, village and municipality in Misiones Province in northeastern Argentina
Hipólito Yrigoyen Partido, district in Buenos Aires Province in central Argentina
Hipólito Yrigoyen, Salta, town and municipality in Salta Province in northwestern Argentina

See also
Irigoyen
Hipólito Yrigoyen (disambiguation)